Movement for Socialist Democracy (in French: Mouvement pour la Démocratie Socialiste) was a political party in Burkina Faso. The MDS surged when the Burkinabè Communist Group split in April 1989. In March 1991 it took the name MDS. It became a founding organization of the ruling Congress for Democracy and Progress in February 1996.

The MDS was led by Jean-Marc Palm and Idrissa Zampaligre.

Defunct political parties in Burkina Faso
Political parties disestablished in 1996
Socialist parties in Burkina Faso